Ranniku is a village in Tõstamaa Parish, Pärnu County, in southwestern Estonia. It is located just west of Tõstamaa, the administrative centre of the municipality, on the coast of Gulf of Riga. It has a population of 28 (as of 1 January 2011).

References

External links
Website of Kastna region (Kastna, Ranniku and Rammuka villages) 

Villages in Pärnu County